The Grist Mill Trail is a 5.0 mile long hiking and biking trail located in Patapsco Valley State Park in the Baltimore County side of the Patapsco Valley near Catonsville, Maryland. The paved pathway runs parallel to the Baltimore and Ohio Railroad to the north, and the Patapsco River to the south.

The original segment of the path connected the Lost Lake to the Patapsco Swinging Bridge in the Avalon area of the park. In 2006, the trail was expanded to Ilchester Road, where a second swinging bridge was built as a connection. All together, the Grist Mill Trail travels from River Road in Relay, Maryland to Ilchester Road/River Road in Ellicott City, Maryland.

References

Bike paths in Maryland
Catonsville, Maryland
Ellicott City, Maryland
Hiking trails in Maryland
Oella, Maryland
Protected areas of Baltimore County, Maryland
Protected areas of Howard County, Maryland